The 2006–07 season is Sydney FC's second season of soccer in Australia. Sydney FC contested in the 2006–07 A-League, and after winning the inaugural A-League Championship in 2005–06, competed in the 2007 AFC Champions League as one of Australia's two representatives.

Review

Preseason
After winning the A-League Championship in his first season with the club, head coach Pierre Littbarski signalled his intentions to remain with Sydney FC for the following season in April, whilst the club indicated that an "in-principle agreement" with Littbarski had been finalised. In May 2006 however, it was revealed that Littbarski would not accept an estimated A$250,000 pay cut to his original contract and thus decided to leave Sydney FC. Two months later, Sydney announced that they had agreed to terms with Motherwell F.C. manager and former England international Terry Butcher, who would sign a two-year deal.

During the off-season, Sydney released Andrew Packer from the final year of his contract for him to return to his home state to play for Queensland Roar, whilst signing Alex Brosque (Queensland – 3 years) and Jeremy Brockie (New Zealand – 2 years). 19-year-old Ruben Zadkovich, who was signed as short-term cover for Ufuk Talay late in the 2005–06 season, also upgraded to a two-year full-time contract with Sydney. Matthew Bingley was released from the squad due to salary cap restrictions.

Preseason Challenge Cup

Group stage

The group stage of the A-League pre-season cup saw Sydney drawn with Queensland Roar FC, Newcastle United Jets and the New Zealand Knights, whilst in the "bonus round" they would face Perth Glory. Sydney decided to host their two "home" matches during the group stage in Canberra (vs Newcastle) and Wollongong (vs Perth), as well as a match in Campbelltown in the final rounds of the competition. Sydney's first match for 2006–07 was against Queensland, and featured the debut of former Queensland player Alex Brosque, as well as Nikolai Topor-Stanley, a short-term signing to cover injury to defender Jacob Timpano. Brosque scored the winning goal for Sydney against his old club with three minutes remaining. Sydney went to the top of the group with a 2–1 win over Newcastle, Topor-Stanley scoring just three minutes into his debut starting appearance, and the Jets' only goal coming from Sydney player Terry McFlynn. A scoreless draw away to New Zealand sealed Sydney's place in the semi-finals, with the "bonus round" against Perth Glory still to play. Sydney won the match 3–0, picking up two bonus points and easily finishing on top of Group B with 12 points to each other teams' three.

Knockout stages
Sydney were drawn against Adelaide United, 2nd-placed finishers in group A, in their semi-final, which was held in Wollongong. Adelaide scored first through Travis Dodd, but a goal from David Carney two minutes before half-time levelled the scores. A red card to Alvin Ceccoli for "foul and abusive language" towards referee Mark Shield after the end of the first half left the hosts with ten men for the remainder, and although Sydney managed to create several chances, Adelaide ultimately came out on top with a goal to Kristian Rees in the final minute of the match. The result left Sydney to play-off with Newcastle for third place in the competition.

The 3rd-place playoff was contested in Campbelltown in south-western Sydney. Injuries and representative duties for several of Sydney's regular players handed Terry Butcher the opportunity to give game time to backup goalkeeper Justin Pasfield, as well as trial uncontracted players such as Nikolas Tsattalios, Jason Naidovski and Steven Bozinovski. Goals to Sasho Petrovski and Mark Rudan saw Sydney win the match 2–0 and take third place in the Pre-Season Cup.

Regular season 
Sydney FC's 2006–07 A-League season campaign began with a rematch against their 2005–06 Grand Final opponents, the Central Coast Mariners. Over 19,000 people turned out to see an Iain Fyfe goal seal the contest for Sydney, while goalkeeper kept a clean sheet with two especially excellent saves keeping Sydney in the match. Sydney's following match was the first played at Melbourne's Telstra Dome – a decision made because Melbourne's regular home ground of Olympic Park was unavailable, but allowed an A-League record attendance of almost 40,000 to see the match. After just 13 minutes, Sydney were behind 2–0 to Melbourne, with captain Mark Rudan having been sent off for retaliation. Coach Terry Butcher praised the "spirit" of the Sydney team as they outscored Melbourne for the remainder of the match, but Sydney could not level the scores as Melbourne took the match 3–2.  Two days before the Melbourne match it was confirmed that Sydney FC's marquee player Dwight Yorke would be leaving the club for English Championship team Sunderland for a reported £200,000 transfer fee. Whilst Yorke still had one season remaining on his original contract with Sydney, the club were not committed to extending his contract and could not compete with the salary rise offered by Sunderland.

With two draws and a win in their following three matches leaving them sitting in third position after five rounds, Sydney welcomed the arrival of Italian Benito Carbone for a four-match "guest stint". The 35-year-old had an instant impact, setting up goals for Ruben Zadkovich and Sasho Petrovski before scoring one of his own as Sydney ran away 4–1 winners over rivals Adelaide at Hindmarsh Stadium. The performance had Carbone touted as a possible marquee replacement for Dwight Yorke, but a management re-shuffle, which saw chairman Walter Bugno replaced by Edmund Capon and CEO Tim Parker by George Perry, forced Sydney to focus on financial stability in their second season and eventually led to the loss of Carbone. Carbone's final appearance for Sydney, in an away match against the Central Coast, was the first in a string of four consecutive matches in which Sydney scored an early goal but failed to win the match. The run coincided with a large injury list for Sydney, travelling to Newcastle with a squad of just 13 players despite the return of Matthew Bingley on a short-term contract. The return of David Carney, however, saw a 4–0 win over the New Zealand Knights, which sparked a streak of six matches in which Sydney conceded just one goal. This gave Sydney a run of eight matches undefeated heading into the Christmas break, where they sat second on the ladder.

Sydney began the 2007 year well, with a 2–0 away win over the Newcastle Jets on New Year's Day. The result ensured that Sydney retained second position and their one-point margin over Adelaide United on the table despite the deduction of three points due to salary cap breaches. In the following match, against New Zealand, Sydney's run of 542 minutes without conceding a goal came to an end, as did their nine-match unbeaten streak. A 1–0 loss to Adelaide in the penultimate round dropped Sydney to third position, and following Newcastle's 4–0 win over Melbourne in the first match of the final round, left Sydney needing to secure at least a point against Queensland Roar in order to finish in the top four. They did so, earning a 1–1 draw and thus scraping into the finals on goal difference ahead of Queensland.

Salary cap breaches 
It was revealed in late 2004, shortly after the launch of the A-League, that the competition's salary cap rules included unrestricted concessions for "service agreements" – off-field earnings from sponsors to players in return for additional services. Then-chairman Walter Bugno confirmed that Sydney would be including service agreements in players' contracts, but denied that Sydney had contravened any rules regarding salaries whilst speculation mounted that Sydney had already exceeded the salary cap and the FFA announced a zero tolerance policy for breaches in the area. During the 2006–07 season, the FFA announced that Sydney had been found guilty of salary cap breaches regarding the 2005–06 season. Although the FFA would not divulge the nature of the breach, Sydney CEO Tim Parker attributed it to Sydney's unexpectedly heavy schedule which saw them play in the 2005 Oceania Club Championship, 2005 FIFA Club World Championship and the A-League finals series – preventing players from completing the additional services for which they were paid. Sydney were fined $89,000 and penalised one competition point, but the fine was reduced to $44,000 and the point penalty suspended due to the Sydney FC administration's co-operation with FFA investigations.

One month after the initial penalty, in September 2006, it was announced that the FFA would again be investigating alleged discrepancies regarding the contract of a Sydney FC player. The investigation concluded that Sydney had committed multiple breaches of the player contracting regulations: "an undisclosed payment made to a player, pre-payments from the club to players and payments made by the club to agents of the players", all of which should have been, but were not included in Sydney's declaration of player payments for 2005–06. FFA Management assessed that the severity of the breaches warranted a $259,000 fine for Sydney as well as a penalty of three competition points, but this was again reduced in consideration of Sydney's co-operation with the investigation. Sydney's final penalty was a $129,000 fine along with the deduction of three competition points (including the activation of the one point suspended penalty from the earlier breach), with a suspended automatic one point penalty should Sydney be found to be in breach of contracting regulations in 2006–07 or 2007–08. Sydney "reluctantly accepted" the decision and elected not to appeal the penalty, which left them still in second position with three premiership rounds remaining, but their gap back to Adelaide United was reduced to a single point.

Postseason
Following the completion of the A-League season, Terry Butcher resigned as Sydney FC coach. He was replaced by Branko Culina, who was appointed as interim coach for the club's AFC Champions League campaign on 13 February 2007.

Friendly matches
As part of Sydney's ACL campaign, a number of friendly matches were arranged against local clubs, and a match against the Malaysian national team.  These matches were generally a part of preparations for upcoming ACL matches (as Australian clubs are not playing as regularly as other Asian domestic leagues) and also to build connections with the NSW football community.

Asian Champions League
As 2005–06 Champions, Sydney qualified for the 2007 AFC Champions League as one of the two teams representing Australia along with 2005–06 League Premiers, Adelaide United. The draw took place in Kuala Lumpur on 22 December 2006.  Sydney were placed into Group E along with J.League 2006 Champions Urawa Reds, Chinese Super League 2006 Runners-up Shanghai Shenhua and Liga Indonesia 2005–06 Champions Persik Kediri.

Group matches were played from March to May 2007, each team playing each other at home and away.  Sydney made an impressive start, defeating Shanghai away and holding Urawa to a draw at Aussie Stadium.  A shock loss to Persik in Indonesia was followed up by a 3–0 win in Sydney two weeks later, but disappointing scoreless draws in the final two matches against Shanghai and Urawa meant Sydney finished second in their group and Urawa progressed to the next stage.

Players

Squad

 Coaches: Terry Butcher, Branko Culina

Transfers in

Transfers out

Short-term signings

Team kit
Sydney retained playing strip from the previous season, supplied by Reebok, and shirt sponsorship with Healthe continued.  The home and away strips were modified for the club's Asian Champions League campaign in early 2007, adding a gold trim for the tournament.

Statistics

Competitions

Overall

Preseason Challenge Cup

Group table

Matches

Knockout Stage

A-League

League table

Matches

Minor semi-final

AFC Champions League

Group stage

Friendlies

References 

2006–07
2006–07 A-League season by team